Green Alternative:

 The Greens – The Green Alternative, an Austrian party founded in 1986 
 Green Alternative (Hungary), a political party in Hungary in 1993-2000
 The Greens–Green Alternative, a political party based in Catalonia
 Green Party – Green Alternative, a party in Croatia registered in 2003
 in Russia:
 Civil United Green Alternative (GROZA), formerly Interregional Green Party, is a Russian movement, founded in 1991, an associate member of the European Green Party
 Green Alternative, a Russian movement founded by Oleg Mitvol in 2009, co-founder of Green Alliance party
 Green Alternative, a Russian political party founded in 2020.